Andinobates altobueyensis (synonyms ) is a species of frog in the family Dendrobatidae. It is endemic to Alto del Buey mountain in the Serranía del Baudó range, in the Chocó Department of western Colombia. Its common names include Alto de Buey poison frog, golden poison-arrow frog, and golden poison frog.

Description
The holotype, an adult female, measured  in snout–vent length. The adult male in the type series measured  in snout–vent length; the other specimens were juveniles or not measured. These frogs are entirely yellow of various shades (yellow, greenish yellow, or golden); some individuals have small black spots on the dorsum, others also on the venter. The skin of back is slightly granular. The tympanum is round and has its postero-dorsal part concealed. Both fingers and toes lack fringes and webbing.

Habitat and conservation
It lives on the ground and in bromeliads. The tadpoles probably live in aroid leaf axils—almost all axils near the summit of Alto del Buey contained a tadpole, but it is not certain that they were this species, as opposed to Andinobates minutus.

This frog has a very restricted range, and there is risk of habitat loss caused by smallholder agricultural activities, logging, and human settlement.

References

altobueyensis
Amphibians described in 1975
Amphibians of Colombia
Endemic fauna of Colombia
Taxonomy articles created by Polbot